CYP305M2 (formerly called LM16181) is a cytochrome P450 enzyme found in migratory locust (Locusta migratoria) that catalyzes the key step of biosynthesis of phenylacetonitrile (PAN). PAN in turn is used as an aposematic chemical defense against predators.

References 

EC 1.14
Cytochrome P450
Insect genes